Day of the Departed is a television special of the computer-animated television series Ninjago: Masters of Spinjitzu (titled Ninjago from the eleventh season onward). The series was created by Michael Hegner and Tommy Andreasen. The special aired on 29 October 2016 to coincide with Halloween and follows the sixth season titled Skybound. It is succeeded by the seventh season, titled Hands of Time.

The 45-minute halloween special replaced the release of a second season for 2016, due to the ongoing development of The Lego Ninjago Movie, which was released in 2017. The special focuses on the events of the Day of the Departed, a national holiday celebrated in Ninjago in which loved ones are remembered. The storyline focuses on the ninja character Cole, who becomes concerned about fading away in his ghostly form, and his battle with the main antagonist Sensei Yang. While Cole is trapped in Yang's temple, the ninja must battle several villainous spirits that he has accidentally released.

Voice cast

Main 
 Jillian Michaels as Lloyd Garmadon, the Green Ninja
 Vincent Tong as Kai, the red ninja and Elemental Master of Fire
 Michael Adamthwaite as Jay, the blue ninja and Elemental Master of Lightning
 Brent Miller as Zane, the white ninja and Elemental Master of Ice
 Kirby Morrow as Cole, the black ninja and Elemental Master of Earth
 Kelly Metzger as Nya, Kai's younger sister and the Elemental Master of Water
 Paul Dobson as Sensei Wu, the wise teacher of the ninja
 Jennifer Hayward as P.I.X.A.L. a female nindroid
 Kathleen Barr as Misako

Recurring 

 Ian James Corlett as Master Chen
 Michael Daingerfield as Dr. Saunders
 Brian Dobson as Ronin
 Michael Dobson as Pythor
 Paul Dobson as General Kozu
 Michael Donovan as Sensei Yang
 Andrew Francis as Morro
 Michael Kopsa as Samukai
 Richard Newman as General Cryptor
 Alan Marriott as Dareth
 Jillian Michaels as Edna
 Colin Murdock as Ed
 Kirby Morrow as Lou

Release 
A trailer for Day of the Departed made its debut at the Lego Ninjago panel at San Diego Comic-Con in July 2016. The trailer was later released on the Lego YouTube channel in August 2016. Day of the Departed was released on Cartoon Network on 29 October 2016.

Plot 
Day of the Departed was a Halloween TV special that takes place after the events of Season 6 and prior to Season 7. The Day of the Departed is a sacred holiday that is celebrated by the people of Ninjago to commemorate their fallen ancestors and friends. On this day, the ninja split up to remember their ancestors and spend time with family members. During a visit to Ninjago History Museum, Cole (who is still a ghost) realizes that he is starting to fade away and, after discovering the Yin Blade, decides to visit the floating Temple of Airjitzu to confront the ghost of Master Yang.

At the temple, Cole accidentally uses the Yin Blade to open a portal to the Departed Realm, thereby releasing the spirits of the ninjas' old enemies, which include Samukai, Kozu, Cryptor, Chen and Morro, who are also joined by Pythor. The spirits possess their mannequins in Ninjago History Museum, which brings them to life. Cole is detained at the temple by Yang's ghost students. Yang then tells the villains that they can stay in Ninjago if they defeat each of the ninja that defeated them. Yang seizes the Yin Blade from Cole and explains that he intends to use the blade to tear open the Rift of Return, so that he can be revived. The ninja are under attack from their old revived enemies, but successfully defeat them one by one. In the meantime, Cole is forced to fight Yang's students as he follows Yang up to the temple roof. Yang uses Airjitzu in an attempt to reach the Rift, but Cole stops him and they fight.

When the ninja are reunited, they realize that they had almost forgotten about Cole. They return to the Temple of Airjitzu as Cole is battling Yang. Cole's spirit is bolstered at the sight of his friends and he shatters the Yin Blade. This frees Yang's students, who are able to cross through the Rift and become human again. Yang tells Cole that he wanted to be remembered, but Cole replies that he will be remembered as the creator of Airjitzu. They agree to cross through the Rift together, but during the ascent, Yang decides to stay at the temple to settle his debts and launches Cole into the Rift. The ninja soon discover that Cole has returned, now in human form once more. They celebrate the return of their friend and decide to use the Temple of Airjitzu as their new base.

Episodes 

An alternate version of the episode was released on January 31, 2017, for China. While it mostly focuses on the same plot, there are some differences that set it apart from the English version.

Critical reception 
Netflix gave Day of the Departed a 7.7 out of 10 rating.

References 

Lego Ninjago: Masters of Spinjitzu episodes
2016 television specials
Halloween television specials